Ničić is a surname of Serbian origin. People with that name include:

 Ilija Ničić (1922-2014), Serbian sport shooter who competed at the 1960 Summer Olympics
 Radovan Ničić (born 1971), Kosovan politician

See also
 

Serbian surnames